Wilhelm August Graah (1793–1863) was a Danish naval officer and Arctic explorer. Graah had mapped areas of West Greenland when he, in 1828–30, was sent by King Frederick VI of Denmark on an expedition to the unmapped eastern coast with the purpose to search for the lost Eastern Norse Settlement.

Expedition

The expedition set out from Copenhagen in the brig Hvalfisken, but - once arrived in Greenland - used umiaks able to navigate in the waters between the coast and the sea ice of southeastern Greenland. In 1829, the expedition reached Dannebrog Island (65° 18' N), where it was stopped by ice. They wintered at Nugarlik (63° 22' N) and returned to the settlements on the west coast of Greenland in 1830. Two naturalists participated - the geologist Christian Pingel and the botanist Jens Vahl. Graah published an account of the exploration.

Graah named the southeastern coast of Greenland King Frederick VI Coast and mapped about 550 km of formerly uncharted territory. Although he had been asked to reach 69°, Graah fell short of his goal of going further north owing to innumerable hardships. He made numerous contacts with the now extinct Southeast-Greenland Inuit, describing in detail some of their customs and way of life.

Honours
The Graah Mountains (Graah Fjelde) and Graah Fjord in the King Frederick VI Coast of SE Greenland, as well as Cape Graah in King Christian X Land were named after him.

See also 
Cartographic expeditions to Greenland
List of Arctic expeditions

Literature
English translation, Narrative of an Expedition to the East Coast of Greenland, London, 1837.

References

External links
The Fate of Greenland's Vikings

Explorers of the Arctic
Danish polar explorers
Scandinavian explorers of North America
Greenlandic polar explorers
1793 births
1863 deaths